Orlando Leopardi (11 January 1902 in Rome – 1 August 1972) was an Italian boxer who competed in the 1924 Summer Olympics. In 1924 he was eliminated in the first round of the middleweight class after losing his fight to Harry Henning.

References

External links
 

1902 births
1972 deaths
Boxers from Rome
Middleweight boxers
Olympic boxers of Italy
Boxers at the 1924 Summer Olympics
Italian male boxers
20th-century Italian people